Weakest Link (also known as The Weakest Link) is a television game show which first appeared in the United Kingdom on BBC Two on 14 August 2000 and originally ended on 31 March 2012 when its host Anne Robinson completed her contract. The original British version of the show is still aired around the world on BBC Entertainment. The game begins with a team of eight or nine contestants who take turns answering general knowledge questions within a time limit to create chains of correct answers in a row. At the end of each round, the players vote one contestant, "The Weakest Link", out of the game. Once two players are left, they play in a head-to-head contest, with five questions asked to each contestant in turn, to determine the winner.

The format has been licensed across the world, with many countries producing their own series of the programme and is the second most popular international franchise, behind only the Who Wants to Be a Millionaire? franchise, which also originated in the UK.

Format
The programme sees a group of contestants ranging from five to nine players who will need to work as a team to try to win as much as possible of a maximum cash jackpot by correctly answering general-knowledge questions in a series of rapid-fire rounds.

Each round features a money chain of anywhere from five to nine increasing cash values, with a maximum cash target that the team must attempt to reach within a time limit. Questions are asked of the team members sequentially. In the first round, play will typically start with the first player alphabetically or by a random-draw before the game starts. The team can most quickly achieve the target by stringing together a chain of consecutive correct answers, the minimum number of which depends on the number of "links" in the money chain, usually but not always the same as the number of contestants at the start of the show. A correct answer increases the value of the succeeding question, while an incorrect answer breaks the chain, losing all money accumulated in that chain. A contestant can secure the accumulated money in the chain by saying "Bank" before their question is asked, some versions require the contestant to wait to bank until their name is called; doing so however resets the chain to zero and the team must rebuild again. The round ends when the team has either run out of time or banked the target, in which case the round ends prematurely. The target amount is the maximum amount available in the round. If the team banks a total exceeding this amount, it is rounded down to the maximum amount. Only the money that has been banked is taken forward in the game, forming the total prize money available at the end.

Each round ends with the team voting off one person from the game. Before the votes are revealed, a voice-over announcer reveals who statistically is the Strongest Link and Weakest Link, determined by how many questions were answered correctly and incorrectly, the amount of money banked and lost, and the total monetary value of the questions asked. The votes are then revealed, followed by inquiry by the host for the reasoning behind the vote, along with berating of the contestants. The person with the most votes is named the Weakest Link regardless of the statistics, is eliminated from the game, and wins nothing. In the event of a tie, the Strongest Link is immediately deemed immune from the vote and must break the tie.

This process repeats, with each successive round beginning with the Strongest Link from the last round, or the second-Strongest Link, if the Strongest Link was voted off, and the time limit available to them decreasing usually by 10 or 15 seconds. Once there are two players remaining, they play one final round, where the money banked is multiplied by a certain amount. In some versions, however, the game has gone straight to the head-to-head finale after the final elimination.

The final two contestants then compete in a head-to-head round to determine the winner, with the Strongest Link from the last round determining who begins the round. The contestants are alternately asked a series of five questions each. The player who correctly answers the most wins the money accumulated in the game. If there is a draw, the game continues to sudden death, where the first to answer a question correctly over their opponent's incorrect answer wins. The loser, like all other contestants prior, goes home with nothing.

Game rule and format variations 
Compared with the original format, the others have some changes, making them not the same as the original.

Host 

In the UK original series, the host is Anne Robinson. Producers chose her with the intention of being both firm to the contestants yet understanding when a contestant gets voted off. However, in producing the show, Robinson began to act cold, harsh and nasty to the contestants. Some international hosts like Chazia Mourali, Montserrat Ontiveros, Andrei Georghe, Neena Gupta, Hülya Uğur Tanrıöver, Fiona Coyne, Goedele Liekens, Laurence Boccolini, and Trine Gregorius went to the BBC Studio for instruction and training purpose (meeting the UK production team and Anne Robinson) to replicate the presenting style.

However, the format distributor BBC Worldwide changed the rules and this is not required anymore. As a result, some international hosts are nicer and more relaxed to the contestants. This has changed the whole program style compared with the original BBC series. The first notable example of this change was seen during George Gray's tenure as host in the 2002–03 syndicated version of the American edition; other times where this has happened were in France (2014–15), Turkey (2015, 2019), Finland (2017–18), Cyprus (2017–21), the Netherlands (2019–20),  Greece (2019–), the United States (2020–), Australia (2021–22), and the United Kingdom (2021–).

The new Dutch host Bridget Maasland is also the first host worldwide not to wear black clothing on every episode. Although she does wear dark and black suits on about half of the shows, she often wears bright colored outfits in the other episodes. Her style of hosting resembles the style Anne Robinson adapted in the later UK shows, asking contestants more about their private lives, let them sing and dance during the voting and chit chat about more than just the mistakes made.

The hosting attitude of Jane Lynch who hosted the American edition's 2020 revival was more so that of sarcasm, and snarky - reminiscent of her noted Sue Sylvester character from Glee.

US version

Syndicated 
In the second syndicated version of the American version, after the second to last round, the last two contestants do not face the clock and the money tree. Instead, the remaining two contestants go straight into the head-to-head round. In the event the Strongest Link is voted off, the Second-Strongest Link makes the decision as to who goes first.

2020 revival 
Unlike the original version, the top prize money available increases after each round. The top prize money starts at $25,000 in round 1 and increases by $25,000 per round until round 4. The top prize money in rounds 5 and 6 is set at $250,000 and $500,000, respectively.

A minor addition to the game is that of a buzzer added to each contestant's podium. This is used both to bank money (with contestants not only having to say the word "bank" before being asked the question but must also press the buzzer), as well as to reveal the contestant's vote.

Some non-gameplay variations were also adapted to the revived series: the contestants no longer handwrite their votes, rather they vote via a touch screen panel, tapping the button of the player they wish to vote off. This screen is also used to present visual information for visual questions - where the host will ask the contestants to identify items that appear on the screen. Additionally, the host will discuss the contestants' mistakes before the vote reveals - with the weakest link being eliminated immediately after the vote reveal. Like season 2 of the syndicated version, once only two contestants remain the game goes straight to the head-to-head round.

Changes from this version were featured in the 2021 Australian version - with the top prize being $250,000 and the prize increases for each round being as follows ($10,000, $15,000, $20,000, $30,000, $75,000, $100,000).

French version 
The latest French version (aired from 2014 to 2015) also does not use the clock and money tree for the final round, and in the penultimate round is the 3-player triple stake round for €15,000 and lasts 90 seconds.

Dutch version 
In the Dutch version that started in May 2019, just like on the latest French version, round 8 was cut from the format after they aired the show for two weeks. Instead, in round 7, the money triples, and one last player is eliminated after that round. Making the top prize money no longer €10,000, but €9,000. After that, the remaining two contestants go straight into the head-to-head round. However, in the 2nd series, the number of contestants dropped to 7. The top prize money decreased to €8,000, and the 90-second round returned.

International versions

The format is currently distributed by BBC Studios, the commercial arm of the BBC, following their merger with BBC Worldwide and also is produced by different production companies. Australia was the 1st country to adapt the format; not all the international versions share the same title as UK.

As with the original British version, all of the hosts wear black clothing (or sometimes dark colours with black). Most versions also have disciplinarian female hosts, again similar to the British original—with exceptions being Fausto Silva (Brazil), Tasos Tryfonos (Cyprus and Greece), Julien Courbet (France), Riku Nieminen (Finland), Nikolai Fomenko (Russia), Eamon Dunphy (Ireland), Edu Manzano, Allan K. (both Philippines), Shirō Itō (Japan), Pedro Granger (Portugal), Enrico Papi (Italy), Tseng Yang Qing (Taiwan), Baybars Altuntaş (Turkey), George Gray (United States) and Romesh Ranganathan (United Kingdom). Gray, Courbet and Ranganathan are comedians, and those versions were designed to play off comedy.

In Croatia, in May 2010, the quiz reached its 1,008th episode, and with the British original is the only version to have reached as many episodes.

Legend: 

 Currently airing  
 No longer airing  
 Unsold pilot  
 Future version

References

 
2000s game shows
2010s game shows
2020s game shows